Thomas Emmet Coleman (February 20, 1893 – February 4, 1964), was chairman of the Republican Party of Wisconsin.

Biography
Coleman was born Thomas Emmett Coleman in 1893 in Aurora, Illinois. He moved to Madison, Wisconsin when he was two years old. Coleman graduated from the University of Chicago and married Catherine Head, with whom he had three children. He died of cancer in 1964.

Career
Coleman was Chairman of the Republican Party of Wisconsin from 1951 to 1955. He was a delegate to the Republican National Convention in 1944, 1948 and 1952. At the 1952 convention, he served as a floor leader. Coleman was also President of Maple Bluff, Wisconsin.

References

External links

People from Aurora, Illinois
Politicians from Madison, Wisconsin
People from Maple Bluff, Wisconsin
Republican Party of Wisconsin chairs
University of Chicago alumni
1893 births
1964 deaths
Deaths from cancer in Wisconsin